The 1967–68 Canada men's national ice hockey team represented Canada and won the bronze medal at the 1968 Winter Olympics held in Grenoble, France. This tournament also counted as the IIHF World Championships and the IIHF European Championships.  The matches were played at the Palais des Sports.

This was the last men's ice hockey team to compete for Canada at the Olympics until the 1980 Winter Olympics held in Lake Placid.

History
In 1965 a permanent national team was established in Winnipeg, Manitoba. The team was coached by Jackie MacLeod and managed by Father David Bauer.

Due to disagreements with the IIHF over the use of professional athletes at world championships, Canada completely withdrew from international amateur hockey and did not send teams to the 1972 or 1976 Winter Olympics.

1968 Winter Olympics
Official roster for the 1968 Winter Olympics:
Head coach: Jackie McLeod
Roger Bourbonnais
Kenneth Broderick
Raymond Cadieux
Paul Conlin
Gary Dineen
Brian Glennie
Ted Hargreaves
Francis Huck
Larry Johnston (C)
John McKenzie
William MacMillan
Stephen Monteith
Morris Mott
Terrence O'Malley
Daniel O'Shea
Gerald Pinder
Herb Pinder
Wayne Stephenson

See also
 Canada men's national ice hockey team
 Ice hockey at the 1968 Winter Olympics
 Ice hockey at the Olympic Games
 List of Canadian national ice hockey team rosters

References

 
Canada men's national ice hockey team seasons